Teng Yu-kun (15 October 1946 – 4 July 2011) was a Golden Horse Award-winning Taiwanese screenwriter.

His younger brother Teng Yu-ching (鄧育慶) was a director with whom he often collaborated on television. Teng Yu-kun was married to actress Chin Mei (金玫) from 1974 to 1988, and actress Leanne Liu from 1999 until his 2011 death, when he accidentally fell out of the window of their third-floor Shanghai apartment.

Filmography (incomplete)

Films

TV series

References

External links

1946 births
2011 deaths
Taiwanese screenwriters
People from Pingtung County
Accidental deaths in the People's Republic of China
National Taiwan University alumni
Accidental deaths from falls